Below are the rosters for the 1999 UEFA European Under-16 Football Championship tournament in the Czech Republic.

Group A

Head coach:

Head coach:

Head coach:

Head coach:

Group B

Head coach:  Dick Bate

Head coach:  Mihály Ubrankovics

Head coach:  Anton Valovič

Head coach:  Hans Lindbom

Group C

Head coach: Martin Novoselac

Head coach: Michał Globisz

Head coach: Aleksandr Grebnev

Head coach: Juan Santisteban

Group D

Head coach:  Štěpán Oldřich

Head coach:  Hans Brun Larsen

Manager: Erich Rutemöller

Head coach:  Thomas Sentelidis

References

1999
Squads